Micrelephas pictella is a moth in the family Crambidae. It was described by Schaus in 1922. It is found in Brazil and Guyana.

References

Moths described in 1922
Moths of South America